Thermobia is a genus of primitive insects belonging to the family Lepismatidae. The genus was erected by Ernst Evald Bergroth in 1890. By far the best known member of the genus is the firebrat (T. domestica), which is often seen in warm places indoors such as bakeries.

References
Fauna Europaea
Nomina Insecta Nearctica

Lepismatidae
Zygentoma
Insect genera
Insects of Europe
Taxa named by Ernst Evald Bergroth